Crown Inn may refer to:

 The Crown Inn, Glossop, Derbyshire, England
 The Crown Inn, Birmingham, England
 The Crown (hotel), Amersham, Buckinghamshire, England
 Crown Hotel, Nantwich, Cheshire, England

See also
 Crown Hotel (disambiguation)